is a Japanese motorcycle racer. He was the All Japan J-GP2 champion in 2016. He currently competes in the RFME Superstock 1000 Championship aboard a Suzuki GSX-R1000.

Career
In 2016 Uramoto made his Grand Prix debut with the Japan-GP2 team riding a Kalex in the Moto2 class at Motegi, finishing the race in 21st place.

Career statistics

Grand Prix motorcycle racing

By season

Races by year

References

External links

Living people
Japanese motorcycle racers
Moto2 World Championship riders
1994 births
Superbike World Championship riders